Tinn is a municipality in Telemark in the county of Vestfold og Telemark in Norway. It is part of the traditional regions of Upper Telemark and Øst-Telemark. The administrative centre of the municipality is the town of Rjukan.

The parish of Tin(d) was established as a municipality on 1 January 1838 (see formannskapsdistrikt). The area of Hovin was separated from the municipality of Tinn in 1860, but it was merged back into the municipality of Tinn on 1 January 1964.

Krossobanen is the oldest aerial tramway in Northern Europe. It was built in 1928 as a gift from Norsk Hydro.  There is a museum and Hardangervidda National Park center at the lake Møsvatn close to Tinn.

General information

Name
The Old Norse form of the name was Tinnr. It is probably the old name of the Lake Tinn, the central lake in the municipality. The meaning of the name is unknown.

Coat-of-arms
The coat-of-arms is from modern times.  They were granted on 18 November 1994.  The arms show five blue drops of water on a silver background.  It was chosen to represent the five rivers in the municipality and the hydropower of Rjukan.  It was designed by Halvor Holtskog.

History
Rjukan Falls on the Måna river allowed construction of Vemork, the largest power station in the world in 1911. The station has become a museum where one can explore the history of the energy and see exhibits about the industrial development in Norway and at Rjukan, the municipality center of Tinn.

The museum is most famous for its presentation of Rjukan's war history. During World War II, Vemork was the site of the Norwegian heavy water sabotage, when Norwegian saboteurs prevented the Germans from producing nuclear weapons from the heavy water which was produced here. The exhibit Atomkappløpet ("The nuclear race") presents the four heavy water sabotages and the allied efforts to develop a nuclear bomb.

Geography
The municipality borders the municipality of Nore og Uvdal (in Buskerud county) to the north, Rollag and Flesberg (also in Buskerud) to the east, Notodden, Hjartdal, and Seljord to the south, and Vinje to the west.

Tinn stretches deeply into the Hardangervidda landscape. On clear days it is possible to see one sixth of Norway from its summit.

Notable people

WWII heavy water saboteurs 
 Arne Kjelstrup MM (1913 in Rjukan – 1995) a Norwegian resistance member during WWII, role in the Norwegian heavy water sabotage 1942–1943
 Knut Lier-Hansen (1916 in Rjukan – 2008) a Norwegian resistance member during WWII, Army sergeant, role in sinking of SF Hydro as a part of the Norwegian heavy water sabotage
 Jens-Anton Poulsson (1918 in Tinn – 2010) a military officer, a Norwegian resistance member, role in the Norwegian heavy water sabotage 1942–1943 
 Claus Helberg (1919 in Rjukan – 2003) a Norwegian resistance member, mountain guide, role in the Norwegian heavy water sabotage

Other public Service 
 Sam Eyde (1866–1940) a Norwegian engineer and industrialist, developed Rjukan Falls to produce hydro electrical power
 Albert Sund (1884–?) a trade union leader and Labour politician, Chairman of the Øst-Telemark faglige Samorg for three years.
 Knut Haugland DSO, MM, (1917 in Rjukan – 2009) a WWII resistance fighter, explorer, who accompanied Thor Heyerdahl on his famous 1947 Kon-Tiki expedition
 Einar-Fredrik Ofstad (1916 in Rjukan – 1998) a Norwegian diplomat
 Gunnar Sønsteby DSO (1918 in Rjukan – 2012) a member of the Norwegian resistance movement and Norway's most highly decorated citizen
 Petter Graver (1920 in Tinn – 1995) a jurist, diplomat from 1947 to 1988 and a lawyer
 Gunnar Odd Hagen (1921–1997) a Norwegian politician and a dentist in Tinn
 Reidun Røed (1921 in Rjukan – 2009) a female Norwegian resistance member
 Bjørn Bruland (1926 in Rjukan – 2014) a Norwegian admiral and politician
 Reidar Engell Olsen (born 1933) a Norwegian politician and sometime Mayor of Tinn
 Jostein Børtnes (born 1937 in Hovin, Telemark) a literary historian and Slavist
 Signe Howell (born 1942 in Tinn) a Norwegian social anthropologist and academic
 Bernt Ivar Eidsvig (born 1953 in Rjukan) a prelate of the Catholic Church and Bishop of Oslo
 Øystein Mæland (born 1960 in Rjukan) a psychiatrist, civil servant and former politician

The Arts 
 Knut Luraas (1782 in Tinn – 1843) a Norwegian Hardingfele fiddler and artist
 Thomas Luraas (1799 in Tinn – 1886) a Norwegian rose painter and clarinetist
 Else Poulsson (1909 in Rjukan – 2002) a Norwegian painter and textile artist
 Jørn Lande (born 1968 in Rjukan) a hard rock and heavy metal singer and songwriter
 Linnea Dale (born 1991 in Tinn) a Norwegian singer.

Sport 
 Snowshoe Thompson (born 1827 in Austbygdi, Telemark as Jon Torsteinsson Rue – 1876) a Norwegian-American, considered the father of California skiing
 Jon Terje Øverland (born 1944 in Rjukan) an alpine skier, competed at the 1964 & 1968 Winter Olympics

Gallery

References

External links

Municipal fact sheet from Statistics Norway

Museum 
Postcard from Tinn
Postmarks/cancels from Tinn

 
Municipalities of Vestfold og Telemark